Times of Joy and Sorrow (USA title), The Lighthouse (UK title), or
, is a 1957 color Japanese film directed by Keisuke Kinoshita, who shot on location at 10 different lighthouses throughout Japan, including opening scenes at Kannonzaki, the site of the country's first lighthouse.

Plot 
In 1932, a young lighthouse keeper returns from his father's funeral with a new bride, who quickly learns the importance of the marital bond to members of her husband's profession, which is often characterized by the hardships of physical isolation and sudden reassignment. Over the next 25 years they transfer to ten different lighthouses throughout Japan, raising two children and befriending multiple colleagues and their families. They endure wartime attacks on the strategically relevant lighthouses as well as a tragedy involving one of their children, ultimately celebrating the other's marriage and settling together into middle age.

Cast 
 Hideko Takamine as Kiyoko Arisawa
 Keiji Sada as Shiro Arisawa
 Takahiro Tamura as Mr. Nozu
 Katsuo Nakamura as Kotaro 
 Yōko Katsuragi as Fuji Tatsuko
 Kōji Mitsui as Mr. Kanemaki
 Kuniko Igawa as Itoko Suzuki
 Shizue Natsukawa as Mrs. Natori
 Masako Arisawa as Yukino
 Hiroko Itō as Masako		
 Noboru Nakaya as Shingo Natori	
 Takeshi Sakamoto as Postmaster
 Ryūji Kita as Natori
 Mutsuko Sakura as Mrs. Kanemaki

Featured Lighthouses 
 Kannonzaki Lighthouse - Miura Peninsula, Kanagawa
 Ishikari Lighthouse - Ishikari, Hokkaido
 Izu Oshima Lighthouse - Izu Ōshima, Izu Islands
 Mizunokojima Lighthouse - Bungo Channel, Oita
 Meshima Lighthouse - Gotō Islands, Nagasaki
 Hajiki Saki Lighthouse - Sado Island, Niigata
 Omaesaki Lighthouse - Omaezaki, Shizuoka
 Anorisaki Lighthouse - Shima, Mie
 Ogijima Lighthouse - Seto Inland Sea, Kagawa
 Hiyoriyama Lighthouse - Otaru, Hokkaido

Legacy 
The highly-popular film has been remade three times for Japanese television, and in 1986 Kinoshita himself reworked it as Big Joys, Small Sorrows, the Western version of its actual title (新・喜びも悲しみも幾歳月), which translates roughly as New Times of Joy and Sorrow.

Its rousing, eponymous theme song was a major hit for Akira Wakayama and became a cultural touchstone of 1950s Japan.

In 1993 a statue depicting the movie's two stars in an iconic pose from publicity materials was erected at Hajikizaki Lighthouse on Sato Island, one of the filming sites, as a tribute to lighthouse staff nationwide.

Availability 
Although the film has not been released on disc or for streaming in the United States, Kinoshita's remake Big Joys, Small Sorrows was among the inaugural films available in Spring 2019 for streaming on The Criterion Channel.

References

External links 
 

1957 films
Films set in the 1980s
Films directed by Keisuke Kinoshita
Shochiku films
Films set in the 1940s
Films set in the Shōwa period
Films set in Hokkaido
Films set in Mie Prefecture
Films set on islands
Films with screenplays by Keisuke Kinoshita
Films set on the home front during World War II
Films about families
Films about military personnel
Works set in lighthouses
Maritime culture
Seafaring films
1950s Japanese films